Ensing is a surname. Notable people with the surname include:

 Janneke Ensing (born 1986), Dutch speed skater and cyclist
 Kyle Ensing (born 1997), American indoor volleyball player 
 Riemke Ensing (born 1939), Dutch-born New Zealand poet
 Thomas Ensing (by 1490–1539), English politician